Kirsti Katariina Simonsuuri (26 December 1945, Helsinki – 29 June 2019, Helsinki) was a Finnish professor, writer, poet, and researcher of ancient literature. Her honors included the J. H. Erkko Award for Best First Book (1980) and the Wolfson Fellowship Award from the British Academy (1981).

Biography
Simonsuuri received her bachelor's degree (1968) and master's degree (1971) from the University of Helsinki. In 1972, she received a second master's degree from the University of Cambridge and five years later, a Ph.D. from the same school.

From 1978–1981, Simonsuuri was a professor of literature at the University of Oulu. In 1981–1982, she was a British Academy Wolfson Fellow at the Warburg Institute. In 1984–1988, she was Fulbright Visiting Scholar at University of California, Los Angeles, Harvard University, and Columbia University. In 1989–1990, she was a visiting scholar at the Centre Louis Gernet; in 1992–1993, she was a scientific fellow at Institute for Advanced Study, Berlin; in 1994, she was a visiting fellow at Magdalen College, Oxford. In 1994–1995, she again served as a professor of literature, this time at the University of Helsinki. From 1995–1998, she was the Director of the Finnish Institute at Athens. In 1998–1999, she worked at the Academy of Finland as a research professor and then served as an academy fellow during the period of 2000 to 2005. She returned to the Institute for Advanced Study, Berlin, in 2001 as a Scientific Fellow.

Partial works

Non-fiction books and essays 
 Homer's original genius: eighteenth-century notions of the early Greek epic (1688–1798). 1979. Cambridge University Press. Cambridge. .
 Nopanheittäjä. 1989. Kirjayhtymä. Helsinki. .
 Ihmiset ja jumalat: myytit ja mytologiat. 1994. Kirjayhtymä. Helsinki. .
 Akropolis. 1999. Tammi. Helsinki. .

Poetry collections 
 Murattikaide. 1980. Kirjayhtymä. Helsinki. . 
 Tuntematon tekijä. 1982. Kirjayhtymä. Helsinki. .
 Euroopan ryöstö. 1984. Kirjayhtymä. Helsinki. .
 Meri, ei mikään maa. 1987. Kirjayhtymä. Helsinki. .
 Enkelten pysäkki. 1990. Kirjayhtymä. Helsinki. .
 Onni ja barbaria. 1995. Kirjayhtymä. Helsinki. .
 Rakkaus tuli kun lähdin maan ääriin. 2000. Tammi. Helsinki. .
 Taivaanrannan ajuri. Valitut runot. 2005. Tammi. Helsinki. .

Prose 
 Pohjoinen yökirja. 1981. Kirjayhtymä. Helsinki. .
 Paholaispoika. 1986. Kirjayhtymä. Helsinki. .
 Miehen muotokuva. 1992. Kirjayhtymä. Helsinki. .
 Eläintarhanhuvila yhdeksän. 2002. Tammi. Helsinki. .

Translations 
 Virginia Woolf: Oma huone. 1980. Kirjayhtymä. Helsinki. .
 Sylvia Plath: Ariel. 1983. Kirjayhtymä. Helsinki. .
 Virginia Woolf: Orlando. 1984. Kirjayhtymä. Helsinki. .
 Euripides: Medeia. 1999. Lasipalatsi. Helsinki. .
 Aiskhylos: Oresteia. 2003. Tammi. Helsinki. .
 William Shakespeare: Sonetit 
 Virginia Woolf: Jaakobin huone. 2008. Tammi. Helsinki. .
 William Shakespeare: Miten haluatte|Kuten haluatte. 2010. WSOY. Helsinki. .

Anthologies 
 Enchanting Beasts. An anthology of modern women poets of Finland. 1990. Forest Books. Lontoo. .

References

Further reading
 

1945 births
2019 deaths
Writers from Helsinki
20th-century Finnish poets
Finnish women academics
Academic staff of the University of Oulu
Academic staff of the University of Helsinki
University of Helsinki alumni
Alumni of the University of Cambridge
Finnish women essayists
Finnish essayists
Finnish women poets
21st-century Finnish poets
20th-century essayists
21st-century essayists
20th-century women writers
21st-century Finnish women writers